Friday (also known as Ellis Prairie) is an unincorporated community in Trinity County. A school opened in Friday in 1884, and a post office opened in 1903. The post office closed in 1955, and by the 1990s Friday had a store, a community center, and some homes. Its population was 99 in 2000.

References

Unincorporated communities in Trinity County, Texas
Unincorporated communities in Texas